= State Avenue Connex Line =

State Avenue Connex is a new BRT serving State Avenue between Downtown Kansas City, Missouri & 109th & Parallel, with transit improvements.
